The 1964 Middle Tennessee Blue Raiders football team represented the Middle Tennessee State College—now known as Middle Tennessee State University—as a member of the Ohio Valley Conference (OVC) during the 1964 NCAA College Division football season. Led by 18th-year head coach Charles M. Murphy, the Blue Raiders compiled a record an overall record of  8–2–1 with a mark of 6–1 in conference play, winning the OVC title. Middle Tennessee was invited to the 1964 Grantland Rice Bowl, where they beat . The team's captains were J. Armstrong and H. Petty.

Schedule

References

Middle Tennessee
Middle Tennessee Blue Raiders football seasons
Ohio Valley Conference football champion seasons
Grantland Rice Bowl champion seasons
Middle Tennessee Blue Raiders football